Granada High School may refer to:

Granada High School, Livermore, California
Granada Hills Charter High School, Granada Hills, California
Granada High School, Granada, Colorado

See also
Grenada High School in Grenada, Mississippi